Brian J. Ford HonFLS HonFRMS (born 1939 in Corsham, Wiltshire) is an independent research biologist, author, and lecturer, who publishes on scientific issues for the general public. He has also been a television personality for more than 40 years. Ford is an international authority on the microscope. Throughout his career, Ford has been associated with many academic bodies. He was elected a Fellow of Cardiff University in 1986, was appointed Visiting Professor at the University of Leicester, and has been awarded Honorary Fellowship of the Royal Microscopical Society and of the Linnean Society of London. In America, he was awarded the inaugural Köhler Medal and was recently recipient of the Ernst Abbe medal awarded by the New York Microscopical Society. In 2004 he was awarded a personal fellowship from NESTA, the National Endowment for Science, Technology and the Arts. During those three years he delivered 150 lectures in scores of countries, meeting 10,000 people in over 350 universities around the world.

Education 
Ford attended the King's School, Peterborough, and then Cardiff University to study botany and zoology between 1959 and 1961, leaving before graduating to set up his own multi-disciplinary laboratory.

Career and positions

Universities
Honorary fellow of Cardiff University
Former dining member of Gonville and Caius College University of Cambridge
Honorary member of Keynes College, University of Kent
President Emeritus of Cambridge Society for the Application of Research
Former Fellow at the Open University
Formerly Visiting Professor at the University of Leicester
President (and now President Emeritus) of University of Cambridge Society for the Application of Research

Learned Societies
Fellow of the Linnean Society - serving as a member of their council as their Zoological Secretary and is their honorary surveyor of scientific instruments
Fellow of the Institute of Biology - a former member of their council and chairman of their history network (He also edited: Institute of Biology: The First Fifty Years which is devoted to the history of this Institute.)
Life fellow of Cambridge Philosophical Society
Fellowship by the National Endowment for Science, Technology and Art in 2004
Honorary Fellow of the Royal Microscopical Society - appointed in February 2017, having been elected as an ordinary fellow in 1962

Other positions 
He was the first British President of the European Union of Science Journalists' Associations, founding Chairman of the Science and Technology Authors Committee at the Society of Authors,  and the president of the Cambridge Society for the Application of Research (CSAR) of Cambridge University. Ford has been a member of Mensa and was a director of British Mensa from 1993–1997, resigning a few months after being elected for a second term. He was elected a Fellow of the Royal Microscopical Society in 1962.

2012 aquatic dinosaur hypothesis 
In the April 2012 issue of Laboratory News, Ford put forward the idea that all large dinosaurs were aquatic, arguing that they were too large and heavy to be land animals. Recent oxygen isotope analysis and taphonomic changes show clear evidence for a semi-aquatic lifestyle, however only for the Spinosaurus, so far no sauropod or ornithischian has been shown to be semi-aquatic.

Bibliography

Books
 Allied Secret Weapons: the War of Science; Weapons Book #19,  . USA Ballantine Books, 1970. , UK, Macdonald, 1970.
Microbiology and food,  (hardback), UK, Catering Times, 1971.  (paperback). UK, Northwood, 1970.
German secret weapons, blueprint for Mars, . Australia, South Africa, & New Zealand, Macdonald.
 Nonscience . . . or how to rule the world, . UK, Wolfe, 1971.
 The optical microscope manual, past and present uses and techniques, . UK, David & Charles, 1973. . USA, Crane Russak, 1973.
 The revealing lens, mankind and the microscope, . UK, George Harrap, 1973.
 Microbe power, tomorrow's revolution, . UK, Macdonald and Jane's, 1976. . USA, Stein and Day, 1976.
 Patterns of sex, the mating urge and our sexual future, . UK, Macdonald and Janes, 1979. . USA, St Martin's Press, 1980.
 The Cult of the expert (hardback) , (paperback) 0552122491. UK, Transworld, 1982.
 101 questions about science, . UK, Hamish Hamilton, 1983.
 101 more questions about science, . UK, Hamish Hamilton, 1984.
 Single lens, the story of the simple microscope, . UK, William Heinemann, 1985. . USA, Harper & Row, 1985.
 Compute, how, where, why ... do you really need to? . UK, Hamish Hamilton, 1985.
The food book, . UK, Hamish Hamilton, 1986.
The human body, . UK, Belitha Books, . USA, Belitha, 1990.
The Leeuwenhoek legacy, . UK, Biopress, . UK, Farrand Press, 1991.
Images of science, a history of scientific illustration, . UK, British Library, 1992. . USA, Oxford University Press, 1993.
My first encyclopaedia of science, . UK, Kingfisher Books, 1993.
The new Guinness book of records quiz book, . UK, Guinness Publishing, 1994.
BSE the facts, . UK, Transworld, 1996.
Genes, the fight for life, . UK, Cassells, 1999. . USA, Sterling Publications, 1999.
Sensitive souls, senses and communication in plants, animals and microbes, . UK, Little, Brown, 1999.
The Future of food, . UK, Thames & Hudson, 2000. . USA and Canada, Thames & Hudson, 2000.
Secret language of life, how animals and plants feel and communicate, . USA, Fromm International, 2000.
Using the digital microscope, . UK, Rothay House, 2002.
Secret Weapons: Technology, Science and the Race to Win World War II, . UK, Osprey Publishing, 2011.
Too Big To Walk: The New Science of Dinosaurs, . UK, William Collins, 2019.
Nonscience Returns, ., UK, Curtis Press,2020.

Audio Book
Understanding Viruses, 30 Questions, 25 Geniuses, 100 Amazing Insights, . USA, Finding Genius Foundation, 2021.

Book chapters
"The recovery, removal, and reconstruction of human skeletal remains, some new techniques", chapter in Field manual for museums. Paris, UNESCO, 1970.
"Récuperation, enlèvement et reconstitution des ossements", chapter in Musées et recherches sur le terrain. Paris, UNESCO, 1970.
Brian J Ford explains why he considers Cardiff the most unappreciated city in the world, chapter in The Cardiff book, . Barry: Stewart Williams Publishers, 1973.
"Discharge to the environment of viruses in wastewater, sludges and aerosols", chapter with JS Slade in Viral pollution of the environment, ed: G Berg, . Boca Raton, CRC Press, 1983.
"Sexually transmitted diseases", chapter in Sex and Your Health ed J Bevan, . London, Mitchell Beazley, 1985.
"Las Enfermedades de Transmisión Sexual y Otras que las Imitan", chapter in El Sexo y la Salud ed J Bevan, . Barcelona, Editorial Planeta, 1985.
"Exploring South Wales", chapter in Walking in Britain, ed J. Hillaby, . London: William Collins, 1988.
Robert Hooke, an introduction to Hooke's Micrographia, commentary on CD-ROM edition of Micrographia, 1665 . Palo Alto, Octavo, 1998.
"Witnessing the birth of the microscope", photoessay in Millennium yearbook of science and the future, . Chicago, Encyclopædia Britannica, 2000.
"Eighteenth-century scientific publishing", chapter in Scientific books, libraries and collectors, . London, Thornton & Tully, 2000.
"Scientific Illustration", chapter in vol 4 of The Cambridge history of science, ed R Porter . Cambridge, Cambridge University Press, 2001.
"Hidden secrets in the Royal Society archive", chapter 3 in Biological collections and biodiversity, eds BS Rushton, P Hackney and CR Tyrie, . Otley, Westbury Academic and Scientific Publishing, 2001.
"Trouble on the hoof, disease outbreaks in Europe," chapter in 2002 book of the year, . Chicago, Encyclopædia Britannica, 2002.
"Human behaviour and the changing pattern of disease", chapter in The changing face of disease, implications for society, . London and Boca Raton, CRC Press, 2004.
"What Next After SARS?" (Severe acute respiratory syndrome), chapter in 2004 book of the year, . Chicago, Encyclopædia Britannica, 2004.
"Bird flu, the next pandemic?", chapter in 2006 book of the year, . Chicago, Encyclopædia Britannica, 2006.
"Robert Hooke", [in] The Great Naturalists, editor Rob Huxley, Natural History Museum, UK: Thames & Hudson, 2007.
"Antony van Leeuwenhoek" [in] The Great Naturalists, editor Rob Huxley, Natural History Museum, UK: Thames & Hudson, 2007.
"Cork and blood smear with Leeuwenhoek microscope" [in] Introduction to Microbiology, US: Sudbury MA: Jones & Bartlett Publishers, Inc., 2007.
"Microscopy in early neurology" [in] Whitaker, Harry; Smith, C. U. M. & Finger, Stan, (editors) Brain, Mind and Medicine: essays in 18th century neuroscience, . Springer, 2007.
"Did Physics matter to the Pioneers of Microscopy?" [in] Advances in Imaging and Electron Physics 158: 27-87, Editor Professor Peter W Hawkes, . New York: Academic Press, 2009.
"Culturing Meat for the Future: Anti-death versus anti-life", [in] Tandy, Charles (editor) Death And Anti-Death, Volume 7, . Palo Alto: Ria University Press, 2010.
"The Future of Food" [in] Faculty of Medicine Study manual, (two volumes). Japan: Z-kai Inc., Shizuoka, 2019.
"Robert Brown's Microscope, 1827-1833", [in] 50 Objects, Stories and Discoveries, . London: Linnean Society, 2020.

References

External links 

 Profile by University of Leicester
 Interview by Spiked-online
 Profile from 'The World is Open'

1939 births
Academics of the Open University
Academics of the University of Leicester
Academics of Cardiff University
Academics of the University of Cambridge
Alumni of Cardiff University
British science writers
English biologists
English male journalists
English television presenters
English radio presenters
Living people
Fellows of the Linnean Society of London
Honorary fellows of the Royal Microscopical Society
People from Corsham
People educated at The King's School, Peterborough
Mensans
Antonie van Leeuwenhoek
People associated with The Institute for Cultural Research